Benyahia Racim Bey (Born in Constantine, Algeria, in 1987) is an Algerian digital illustrator and cartoonist.

Racim Benyahia is the winner of the 1st Prize for the Best Poster at the 5th International Festival of Comics of Algeria (2012).

He was also awarded the 3rd Prize at the 4th version of the same international festival in 2011.

"Constantine 1836" 
In 2017, at the "Maghreb des Livres" in Paris, an event of which he designed the official poster, Racim Benyahia presented his first comic book, "Constantine 1836" (Dalimen Editions, 2016), illustrating the first Battle of Constantine in 1836 featuring the resistance of Ahmed Bey against the colonial armies led by the Maréchal Clausel. The author insisted on the fact that although he added a personal touch, he remained as "faithful" as possible to the historical records related to this major battle in French-Algerian history.

Artistic background and family ties
He is the son of Algerian artist Ahmed Benyahia, and nephew of Algerian French artist Samta Benyahia.

References

External links and references
  اختتام المهرجان الدولي الخامس للشريط المرسوم بالجزائر
  La BD dans la peau
  Dessine-moi mon Histoire !
  Une édition dédiée aux pionniers et aux nouveaux auteurs
  Résultats Concours Affiche
  Tomber de rideau et remise de prix
  Alger, bulles sans frontières
  50 jours de formation BD, 5 albums nouveaux
  Cérémonie autour des lauréats 2012

Algerian artists
Living people
1987 births
People from Constantine, Algeria
Algerian contemporary artists
21st-century Algerian people